This article contains lists of results of the United States men's national water polo team at the Summer Olympics. The lists are updated as of March 30, 2020.

Basics
Men's water polo tournaments have been staged at the Olympic Games since 1900. The United States has participated in 22 of 27 tournaments. The United States team is the only non-European squad to win medals in the men's Olympic water polo tournament.

Best results:
 1st place ( Gold medal):
  1904 St. Louis (demonstration event)
 2nd place ( Silver medal):
  1904 St. Louis (demonstration event)
  1984 Los Angeles
  1988 Seoul
  2008 Beijing
 3rd place ( Bronze medal):
  1904 St. Louis (demonstration event)
  1924 Paris
  1932 Los Angeles
  1972 Munich

Latest medal:
  Silver medal (2nd place):  2008 Beijing

Results

1900 Summer Olympics
 Number of participating nations: 4
 Host city:  Paris
 Final Ranking: Did not participate

1904 Summer Olympics
 Number of participating nations: 1 (Demonstration event)
 Host city:  St. Louis
 Final Ranking (Demonstration event):
 New York Athletic Club (NYAC): 1st place ( Gold medal)
 Chicago Athletic Association (CAA): 2nd place ( Silver medal)
 Missouri Athletic Club (MAC): 3rd place ( Bronze medal)

1908 Summer Olympics
 Number of participating nations: 4
 Host city:  London
 Final Ranking: Did not participate

1912 Summer Olympics
 Number of participating nations: 6
 Host city:  Stockholm
 Final Ranking: Did not participate

1920 Summer Olympics
 Number of participating nations: 12
 Host city:  Antwerp
 Final Ranking: 4th place

1924 Summer Olympics
 Number of participating nations: 13
 Host city:  Paris
 Final Ranking: 3rd place ( Bronze medal)

1928 Summer Olympics
 Number of participating nations: 14
 Host city:  Amsterdam
 Final Ranking: 7th place

1932 Summer Olympics
 Number of participating nations: 5
 Host city:  Los Angeles
 Final Ranking: 3rd place ( Bronze medal)

1936 Summer Olympics
 Number of participating nations: 16
 Host city:  Berlin
 Final Ranking: 9th place

1948 Summer Olympics
 Number of participating nations: 18
 Host city:  London
 Final Ranking: 11th place

1952 Summer Olympics
 Number of participating nations: 21
 Host city:  Helsinki
 Final Ranking: 4th place

1956 Summer Olympics
 Number of participating nations: 10
 Host city:  Melbourne
 Final Ranking: 5th place

1960 Summer Olympics
 Number of participating nations: 16
 Host city:  Rome
 Final Ranking: 7th place

1964 Summer Olympics
 Number of participating nations: 13
 Host city:  Tokyo
 Final Ranking: 9th place

1968 Summer Olympics
 Number of participating nations: 15
 Host city:  Mexico City
 Final Ranking: 5th place

1972 Summer Olympics
 Number of participating nations: 16
 Host city:  Munich
 Final Ranking: 3rd place ( Bronze medal)

1976 Summer Olympics
 Number of participating nations: 12
 Host city:  Montreal
 Final Ranking: Did not qualify

1980 Summer Olympics
 Number of participating nations: 12
 Host city:  Moscow
 Final Ranking: Qualified but withdrew

1984 Summer Olympics
 Number of participating nations: 12
 Host city:  Los Angeles
 Final Ranking: 2nd place ( Silver medal)

1988 Summer Olympics
 Number of participating nations: 12
 Host city:  Seoul
 Final Ranking: 2nd place ( Silver medal)

1992 Summer Olympics
 Number of participating nations: 12
 Host city:  Barcelona
 Final Ranking: 4th place

1996 Summer Olympics
 Number of participating nations: 12
 Host city:  Atlanta
 Final Ranking: 7th place

2000 Summer Olympics
 Number of participating nations: 12
 Host city:  Sydney
 Final Ranking: 6th place

2004 Summer Olympics
 Number of participating nations: 12
 Host city:  Athens
 Final Ranking: 7th place

2008 Summer Olympics
 Number of participating nations: 12
 Host city:  Beijing
 Final Ranking: 2nd place ( Silver medal)

2012 Summer Olympics
 Number of participating nations: 12
 Host city:  London
 Final Ranking: 8th place

2016 Summer Olympics
 Number of participating nations: 12
 Host city:  Rio de Janeiro
 Final Ranking: 10th place

Statistics

By tournament

Historical progression of the best finish

By opponent

Records

Victories, ties and defeats
 Biggest victory in an Olympic match

 Biggest home victory in an Olympic match

 Heaviest defeat in an Olympic match

 Heaviest home defeat in an Olympic match

 Most victories in an Olympic tournament
 6, 1972 Summer Olympics
 6, 1984 Summer Olympics

 Most consecutive victories in an Olympic tournament
 6, Aug 1, 1984 vs.  – Aug 9, 1984 vs. 

 Most consecutive victories at the Olympic Games
 8, Oct 22, 1968 vs.  – Aug 31, 1972 vs. 

 Most matches without defeat in an Olympic tournament
 8, 1972 Summer Olympics

 Most consecutive matches without defeat in an Olympic tournament
 7, Aug 1, 1984 vs.  – Aug 10, 1984 vs. 

 Most consecutive matches without defeat at the Olympic Games
 10, Sep 4, 1972 vs.  – Sep 21, 1988 vs. 

 Most defeats in an Olympic tournament
 5, 2000 Summer Olympics
 5, 2012 Summer Olympics
 Most consecutive defeats in an Olympic tournament
 5, Aug 4, 2012 vs.  – Aug 12, 2012 vs. 
 Most consecutive defeats at the Olympic Games
 7, Aug 4, 2012 vs.  – Aug 8, 2016 vs. 

 Most matches without victory in an Olympic tournament
 5, 2000 Summer Olympics
 5, 2012 Summer Olympics
 Most consecutive matches without victory in an Olympic tournament
 5, Aug 4, 2012 vs.  – Aug 12, 2012 vs. 
 Most consecutive matches without victory at the Olympic Games
 7, Aug 4, 2012 vs.  – Aug 8, 2016 vs. 

 Most ties in an Olympic tournament
 2, 1972 Summer Olympics
 Most matches without a tie in an Olympic tournament
 9, 1952 Summer Olympics
 Most consecutive matches without a tie at the Olympic Games
 57, Sep 21, 1988 vs.  – Aug 14, 2016 vs.

Goals for and against
 Most goals for in an Olympic match

 Least goals for in an Olympic match

 Most goals against in an Olympic match

 Least goals against in an Olympic match

 Most matches scoring in an Olympic tournament
 9, 1972 Summer Olympics

 Most consecutive matches scoring in an Olympic tournament
 9, 1972 Summer Olympics

 Most consecutive matches scoring at the Olympic Games
 97, Nov 28, 1956 vs.  – Aug 14, 2016 vs. 

 Most matches without scoring in an Olympic tournament
 1, 1928 Summer Olympics
 1, 1932 Summer Olympics
 1, 1948 Summer Olympics
 1, 1952 Summer Olympics

 Most matches conceding a goal in an Olympic tournament
 9, 1952 Summer Olympics
 9, 1972 Summer Olympics

 Most consecutive matches conceding a goal in an Olympic tournament
 9, 1952 Summer Olympics
 9, 1972 Summer Olympics

 Most consecutive matches conceding a goal at the Olympic Games
 108, Jul 31, 1948 vs.  – Aug 14, 2016 vs.

See also
 List of United States men's Olympic water polo team rosters
 United States men's Olympic water polo team statistics
 United States men's Olympic water polo team statistics (appearances)
 United States men's Olympic water polo team statistics (matches played)
 United States men's Olympic water polo team statistics (scorers)
 United States men's Olympic water polo team statistics (goalkeepers)
 United States men's Olympic water polo team statistics (medalists)
 United States men's national water polo team

References

External links
 Official website

Men's Olympic results
Olympic men's results
United States Olympic men's results